Bjarne Jensen (born  in Haslev Municipality) is a Danish wheelchair curler.

He participated in the 2006 Winter Paralympics where Danish team finished on fifth place.

Teams

References

External links 

Living people
1956 births
Danish male curlers
Danish wheelchair curlers
Paralympic wheelchair curlers of Denmark
Wheelchair curlers at the 2006 Winter Paralympics